Hans Weilbächer (23 October 1933 – 1 August 2022) was a German footballer who played as a midfielder. He was capped once for the West Germany national team in 1955 against Republic of Ireland. With his club side Eintracht Frankfurt, he won the German championship in 1959 and reached the European Cup final in the following year against Real Madrid which the Eagles lost.

References

External links
Hans Weilbächer at eintracht-archiv.de

1933 births
2022 deaths
German footballers
Association football midfielders
Germany international footballers
Eintracht Frankfurt players
People from Main-Taunus-Kreis
Sportspeople from Darmstadt (region)
Footballers from Hesse
West German footballers